Kachalinskaya is a rural locality (a stanitsa) in Kachalinskoye Rural Settlement, Ilovlinsky District, Volgograd Oblast, Russia. The population was 442 as of 2010. There are 14 streets.

Geography 
Kachalinskaya is located 39 km south of Ilovlya (the district's administrative centre) by road. Kachalino is the nearest rural locality.

References 

Rural localities in Ilovlinsky District
Don Host Oblast